The 2019–2020 Peruvian constitutional crisis began when President Martín Vizcarra dissolved the Congress of Peru on 30 September 2019 considering a de facto denial of the vote of confidence. Congress responded by declaring Vizcarra's presidency suspended and appointed Vice President Mercedes Aráoz as interim president, moves that were largely seen as null and void.

The next day, on 1 October 2019, interim president Aráoz announced her resignation, while Vizcarra issued a decree for legislative snap elections to be held on 26 January 2020.

Background 

The presidency of Peru and the Congress of Peru have been in conflict since the beginning of the tenure of former President Pedro Pablo Kuczynski in 2016. On 15 September 2017, Congress passed, by a wide margin, a motion of no confidence against the prime minister and the cabinet, leading to a complete overhaul of the cabinet and appointment of a new prime minister.

Kuczynski resigned from office in March 2018, when the vote-buying Kenjivideos scandal broke. He was replaced by First Vice President, Martín Vizcarra.

Vizcarra made anti-corruption initiatives his main priority, pushing for a constitutional referendum to prohibit private funding for political campaigns, to ban the re-election of lawmakers, and to create a second legislative chamber. Transparency International praised the move: "This is a very important opportunity, one that is unlike previous opportunities because, in part, the president appears genuinely committed."

While Vizcarra pursued actions against corruption, political leader Keiko Fujimori was arrested in October 2018 on money laundering and corruption charges related to the Odebrecht scandal. The Fujimorists of the Popular Force party held the majority of seats in the Congress of Peru and had made Vizcarra's efforts complicated since he was vice president. Following the arrest of Fujimori, the Fujimorist-led congress introduced a bill to change Vizcarra's referendum proposals. Peruvians ultimately agreed with Vizcarra's proposals during the referendum in December 2018.

No-confidence law 
In the Constitution of Peru, the executive branch can dissolve Congress after a second vote of no-confidence. The first vote of no-confidence occurred in September 2017.

Demanding reforms in the Constitutional Court organic law, Vizcarra called for a vote of no confidence on 27 September 2019, stating it was "clear the democracy of our nation is at risk". Vizcarra and the Inter-American Commission on Human Rights criticized Congress for blocking a proposal for general elections while it quickly approved nominations to the Constitutional Court of Peru without investigating the backgrounds on nominees. Vizcarra sought to reform the Constitutional Court nomination process and Congress' approval or disapproval of his proposal was seen "as a sign of confidence in his administration".

Events

Constitutional Court nominations 
The Congress scheduled the election of the new members to the Constitutional Court of Peru for September 30.

On September 30, the prime minister Salvador del Solar went to the Legislative Palace to request the approval of an amendment to the Organic Law of the Constitutional Court as a matter of confidence. However, the Congress scheduled the minister to the afternoon. While the congress started the debate for the election of the new judges, the prime minister entered the Congress hemicycle room. Del Solar addressed the lawmakers to vote to reform the Constitutional Court nomination process. However, the Congress decided to postpone the vote of the amendment to the afternoon.

The Congress named a new member to the Constitutional Court of Peru. Many of the Constitutional Court nominees selected by Congress were alleged to be involved in corruption. Hours later, the Congress approved the confidence motion.

Dissolution of Congress 
Notwithstanding the affirmative vote, Vizcarra stated that the appointment of a new member of the Constitutional Court constituted a de facto vote of no confidence. He said that it was the second act of no-confidence in his government, granting him the authority to dissolve Congress. These actions by Congress, as well as the months of slow progress towards anti-corruption reforms, pushed Vizcarra to dissolve the legislative body on 30 September, with Vizcarra stating "Peruvian people, we have done all we could."

Congress declares interim president 
Shortly after Vizcarra announced the dissolution of Congress, the legislative body refused to recognize the president's actions, declared Vizcarra as suspended from the presidency, and named Vice President Mercedes Aráoz as the interim president of Peru. Despite this, Peruvian government officials stated that the actions by Congress were void as the body was officially closed at the time of their declarations. By the night of 30 September, Peruvians gathered outside of the Legislative Palace of Peru to protest against Congress and demand the removal of legislators while the heads of the Peruvian Armed Forces met with Vizcarra, announcing that they still recognized him as president of Peru and head of the armed forces.

Resignation of Aráoz 
During the evening of 1 October 2019, Mercedes Aráoz, whom Congress had declared interim president, resigned from office. Aráoz resigned, hoping that the move would promote the new general elections proposed by Vizcarra and postponed by Congress. President of Congress Pedro Olaechea was left momentarily speechless when informed of Aráoz's resignation during an interview. At the time, no governmental institution or foreign government recognized Aráoz as president.

Legislative elections decreed 
Vizcarra issued a decree calling for legislative elections on 26 January 2020. The Organization of American States released a statement saying that the Constitutional Court could determine the legality of President Vizcarra's actions and supported his call for legislative elections, saying "It's a constructive step that elections have been called in accordance with constitutional timeframes and that the definitive decision falls to the Peruvian people".

Response 
Christine Armario of the Associated Press wrote, "The dissolution of congress has plunged Peru into its deepest constitutional crisis in nearly three decades, and it may also be the start of a final, bleak chapter for the country's most prominent political dynasty. When the legislature was last shut down in 1992, strongman Alberto Fujimori sat in the presidential palace calling the shots. Fast forward 27 years, and now it is the party led by his cherished eldest daughter that is being kicked out". Public opinion polls by the Institute of Peruvian Studies (IEP) showed that 84% of respondents approved of Vizcarra's move to dissolve Congress. A similar poll by Peruvian pollster CPI found 89.5% of respondents supported the dissolution of Congress.

Reactions

Martín Vizcarra 
The contested President Martín Vizcarra questioned the legality of the Congressional inauguration of Vice President Mercedes Aráoz as Interim President and the members involved in this act of challenge of authority. You can't just say 'I've sworn in as President, but I was just kidding.' Swearing into a public office in a legislative institution in front of a congressional audience is a legal action in the moment.

References 

2019 in Peru
2020 in Peru
Peru
October 2019 events in Peru
September 2019 events in Peru
January 2020 events in Peru
Political history of Peru